The first inscriptions on UNESCO's Memory of the World Register were made in 1997. By creating a compendium of the world’s documentary heritage, including manuscripts, oral traditions, audio-visual materials, library and archive holdings, the program aims to promote the exchange of information among experts and raise resources for the preservation, digitization, and dissemination of documentary materials. As of December 2018, 429 main documentary heritages had been inscribed in the Register, with 116 of these from Asia and the Pacific.

The Memory of the World Committee for Asia and the Pacific, known as MOWCAP, is a regional committee of UNESCO's global programme.

Items listed below are part of the UNESCO Memory of the World Registry, but not a regional list created by MOWCAP, nor made up of national lists, although such lists have been envisioned.

List by country/territory

See also
Suyat

Notes

A. Names and spellings provided are based on the official list released by the Memory of the World Programme.

References

External links
 
 
 
 
 30th anniversary - UNESCO’s Memory of the World